The list of rivers of Odisha state, located in Eastern India.

They are tributaries to the Bay of Bengal of the Indian Ocean.

Rivers
Baitarani River
Bhargavi River
Bhede River
Brahmani River
Budhabalanga River
Chitroptala river
Daya River
Devi River
Dhamra River
Ib River
Kadua River
Kathajodi River
Kharkai River
Koina River
Kuakhai River
Kushabhadra River
Mahanadi
Malaguni River
Nagavali River
Ong River
River Kolab
Rushikulya
Sabari River
Sankh River
Sileru River
South Karo River
South Koel River
Subarnarekha River
Surubalijora
Tel River
Telen River
Vaitarani River
Vamsadhara River

 
Odisha
Rivers
Environment of Odisha